Bristol City Football Club is an English association football club based in the city of Bristol. Founded in 1894 as Bristol South End, the team first entered the FA Cup in 1895–96, and played in the Western League in 1896–97. The club then turned professional, changed its name to Bristol City, and joined the Southern League. In 1900, City merged with another Southern League club, Bedminster, and the following season gained admission to the Football League, in which the first team have played ever since. They won the Second Division title in 1905–06, and followed up with a runners-up finish in the 1906–07 First Division, three points behind champions Newcastle United. That remains the club's best Football League placing, and two years later they set another record in the 1908–09 FA Cup. City entered the competition at the first-round stage and despite needing a replay in every round apart from the third, went on to reach the final, in which they lost 1–0 to league champions Manchester United. After five seasons in the top flight, City were relegated back to the second tier.

Between the wars, they regularly moved between the second and third tiers, collecting two Third Division South titles in 1922–23 and 1926–27. In the 1930s, they entered the Welsh Cup, and beat another English club, Tranmere Rovers, after a replay to win the 1934 final. When competitive football resumed after the Second World War, City continued to yo-yo between the divisions until 1976, when they returned to the First Division for another four seasons. Financial problems multiplied as the team suffered successive relegations, and the club was on the verge of failure when eight senior playersdubbed the Ashton Gate Eight after the name of City's stadiumagreed to cancel their lengthy contracts. Although the team were again relegated at the end of the 1981–82 season, taking them into the Fourth Division for the first time in their history as well as setting an unwanted record of three consecutive Football League relegations, the club was able to continue in business.

City spent only two seasons in the fourth tier. In 1988–89 they made their second appearance in the semi-final of the League Cupthe first came in 1970–71and they returned to the second tier in 1990. In the next 25 years, they experienced three relegations and three promotions between second and third tiers. While in the third tier, they won the Football League Trophya competition for teams in the lower divisions of the Football Leaguethree times, in 1986, 2003 and 2015, as well as reaching the final twice more.

As of the end of the 2021–22 season, Bristol City have spent 2 seasons in the fourth tier of the English football league system, 45 in the third, 54 in the second and 9 in the top tier. The table details the team's achievements and the top goalscorer in senior first-team competitions from their first season in the FA Cup in 1895–96 to the end of the most recently completed season.

Key

Key to league record:
P – Played
W – Games won
D – Games drawn
L – Games lost
GF – Goals for
GA – Goals against
Pts – Points
Pos – Final position

Key to divisions:
West 1 – Western League First Division
West P – Western League Professional Section
South – Southern League First Division
United – United League
Div 1 – Football League First Division
Div 2 – Football League Second Division
Div 3 – Football League Third Division
Div 3S – Football League Third Division South
Div 4 – Football League Fourth Division
Champ – Football League Championship, EFL Championship
League 1 – Football League One
League 2 – Football League Two

Key to rounds:
Group – Group stage
Int'l – International group stage
Prelim – Preliminary round
QR1 – First qualifying round
QR2 – Second qualifying round, etc.
Inter – Intermediate round (between qualifying rounds and rounds proper)
R1 – First round
R2 – Second round, etc.
QF – Quarter-final
SF – Semi-final
F – Final
W – Winners
(S) – Southern section of regionalised stage

Details of the abandoned 1939–40 Football League season are shown in italics and appropriately footnoted.

Seasons

Notes

References

External links
Bristol City F.C. official website

Seasons
 
Bristol City F.C.